The March of Dimes Prize in Developmental Biology is awarded once a year by the March of Dimes. It carries a $250,000 award "to an investigator whose research brings us closer to the day when all  babies will be born healthy."  It also includes a medal in the shape of a Roosevelt (who founded the March of Dimes) dime.

Laureates 
Source: March of Dimes
 2020 Susan Fisher
 2019 Myriam Hemberger
 2018 Allan C. Spradling
 2017 Charles David Allis
 2016 Victor R. Ambros and Gary B. Ruvkun
 2015 Rudolf Jaenisch
 2014 Huda Y. Zoghbi
 2013 Eric N. Olson 
 2012 Elaine Fuchs and Howard Green
 2011 Patricia Ann Jacobs and David C. Page
 2010 Shinya Yamanaka
 2009 Kevin P. Campbell and Louis M. Kunkel
 2008 Philip A. Beachy and Clifford Tabin
 2007 Anne McLaren and Janet Rossant
 2006 Alexander Varshavsky
 2005 Mario R. Capecchi and Oliver Smithies
 2004 Mary F. Lyon
 2003 Pierre Chambon and Ronald M. Evans
 2002 Seymour Benzer and Sydney Brenner
 2001  and Thomas M. Jessell
 2000 H. Robert Horvitz
 1999 Martin J. Evans and Richard L. Gardner
 1998 Davor Solter
 1997 Walter J. Gehring and David S. Hogness
 1996 Beatrice Mintz and Ralph L. Brinster
 1993 Alex Jones and Vinny Testaverde
 1986 Joseph Warkany

See also

 List of biology awards
 List of medicine awards

References

Medicine awards
Lists of award winners
Biology awards